Gluma is a genus of kelp flies in the family Coelopidae.

Species
Gluma keyzeri McAlpine, 1991
Gluma musgravei McAlpine, 1991
Gluma nitida McAlpine, 1991

References

Coelopidae
Sciomyzoidea genera